Long Tom may refer to:

 Long Tom River, in Oregon, United States
 Long Tom Pass, a mountain pass in Mpumalanga, South Africa
 Long Tom Commando, a light infantry regiment of the South African Army
 Long Tom (fish), common name for the Belonidae or Needlefish
 Long Tom (rocket), an Australian sounding rocket
 Long Tom (cannon), a generic name for some early cannon and field guns, more specifically:
 155 mm Long Tom, a U.S. World War II era field gun
 155 mm Creusot Long Tom, a Boer War field gun
 Major Thomas J. "Long Tom" Roberts, fictional character in the Doc Savage stories
 "Long Tom" Watson, protagonist in the Long Tom's treasure legend
 Long Tom Hughes (1878–1956), American baseball player